Owl on a Frog is an early 17th century sculpture depicting an owl preying on a frog. The Austrian-produced sculpture is currently in the collection of the Metropolitan Museum of Art.

References 

Sculptures of the Metropolitan Museum of Art
Bronze sculptures in New York City
Owls in culture
Frogs in art